Asadullah Khan is an Afghan former cricketer. Khan is a right-handed batsman and right arm medium-pace bowler. He has previously represented the Afghanistan national cricket team.

Playing career
His debut for the national team came in 2003 when Afghanistan played Chitral District in the 2003/04 Inter-District Senior Tournament.  He later represented Afghanistan in the 2004 ACC Trophy, where he represented Afghanistan in 6 matches, the last of which came against Nepal.

Three years passed before Khan represented Afghanistan again.  In 2007, he represented the team in 2007/08 Inter-District Senior Tournament, playing 3 matches against Lower Dir District, Charsadda District and Swat District.  The following year he was a member of Afghanistan's 2009 ICC World Cricket League Division Three squad.  During that tournament he played a single match for Afghanistan against Papua New Guinea in Buenos Aires, Argentina.

Post-playing career
Khan no longer represents the senior team, but is a senior youth coach for the Afghan Youth Cricket Association. He is the current coach of the newly formed Tajikistan national cricket team. He is also going to be the chief guest of Rajagiri Public School,Doha,Qatar for the school's annual athletic meet.

In 2021, Khan was appointed head coach of the Qatar national cricket team.

References

1987 births
Living people
Afghan cricketers
Afghan cricket coaches
Afghan expatriate sportspeople in Tajikistan
Afghan expatriate sportspeople in Qatar